Louhajang River is located in central Bangladesh. It branches out from the Jamuna near Gabsain at Bhuapur, Tangail District. Thereafter it splits into two parts before the parts meet up again. It flows past Tangail city, Karotia and Jamurki before joining the Bangshi. The Louhajang is linked with the Dhaleshwari.

References

External links

  Includes a map of the river.

Rivers of Bangladesh
Rivers of Dhaka Division